Leon C. "Ex" Exelby (1888 – September 29, 1962) was an American football player and coach of football and basketball.  He played college football at Michigan Agricultural College—now known as Michigan State University—from 1907 to 1910.  He was captain of the 1910 Michigan Agricultural team.  Playing as a fullback, he was selected by Walter Eckersall to the 1910 All-Western college football team.  Exelby served as the head football coach at the University of Wyoming for one season in 1912, compiling a record of 2–7.  He was also Wyoming's head basketball coach that academic year, 1912–13, tallying a mark of 2–5.  Exelby died on September 29, 1962, in Owosso, Michigan.

Head coaching record

Football

References

External links
 

1888 births
1962 deaths
American football fullbacks
Michigan State Spartans football players
Wyoming Cowboys basketball coaches
Wyoming Cowboys football coaches